Casasia nigrescens is a species of plant belonging to the family Rubiaceae.  It is found in Cuba.

References

nigrescens